Aberbach is a surname of German and Jiddish origin. It is mostly a variant of  Auerbach that probalby stems from its Hebrew spelling (אברבך) with the letter Beth that can be read a "v" or as "b". Notable people with the surname include:

Jean Aberbach (1910–1992), Austrian-born American music publisher
Julian Aberbach (1909–2004), Austrian-born American music publisher

See also
Auerbach (Jewish family)

German-language surnames